North Carolina's 109th House district is one of 120 districts in the North Carolina House of Representatives. It has been represented by Republican Donnie Loftis since his appointment in November 2021.

Geography
Since 2003, the district has included part of Gaston County. The district overlaps with the 43rd Senate district.

District officeholders since 2003

Election results

2022

2020

2018

2016

2014

2012

2010

2008

2006

2004

2002

References

North Carolina House districts
Gaston County, North Carolina